Benjamin Marius Telders (19 March 1903 – 6 April 1945) was a professor of law at Leiden University. He is known for standing up for his belief in the rule of law and civil society during the German Occupation.

From 1938 he became involved in Dutch politics; he was party chairman of the Liberal State Party from 1938–1945.

Rudolph Cleveringa and Telders led the resistance to a declaration requiring the dismissal of 'non-Aryan' staff that all professors were told to sign in October 1940. He was arrested that December and imprisoned in Scheveningen. He died of typhus in Bergen-Belsen concentration camp shortly before the end of the war. He was awarded the Dutch Cross of Resistance on 9 May 1946 (posthumously).

Telders Students Society of International Law, the Telders Foundation, and the Telders International Law Moot Court Competition are named after him.

References

External links
Lemma in Biografisch Woordenboek van Nederland 
Erades, L. (1955). B. M. Telders (1903–1945). Nederlands Tijdschrift Voor Internationaal Recht, 2(2), 123–126. http://doi.org/10.1017/S0165070X00034604

1903 births
1945 deaths
Dutch legal scholars
Dutch resistance members
Recipients of the Dutch Cross of Resistance
Leiden University alumni
Academic staff of Leiden University
Liberal State Party politicians
20th-century Dutch lawyers
20th-century Dutch politicians
Dutch people who died in Bergen-Belsen concentration camp
Resistance members who died in Nazi concentration camps
Politicians who died in Nazi concentration camps
Deaths from typhus